Stupid Doo Doo Dumb is the second album by Bay Area rapper Mac Dre. Marking a comeback for Dre following his prison sentence, it is one of his most popular albums to date. It was Mac Dre's first album to include no production by earlier main collaborator Khayree beyond the compilation "Mac Dre Presents... The Rompalation Vol. 1."

Track listing
"JT's Intro" (featuring JT The Bigga Figga)
"Life's a Bitch"
"Da Real Deal" (featuring Sugawolf) (4:28)
"3C Romp" (3:38)
"Stupid Doo Doo Dumb" (featuring Mac Mall & Miami)
"Crest Creepers" (featuring Sugawolf, Jamar, Naked, Da Unda Dogg, Reek Daddy & Mac Mall) (4:02)
"Hoes We Like" (featuring Sleep Dank)
"Nothin Correctable" (4:54)
"Freaky Shit" (4:43)
"Real Niggaz"
"Get Yo' Grits" (4:15)
"Hoez Love It" (featuring Spice 1) (3:45)
"All It Takes" (featuring Shima) (5:01)
"I Need A Eighth" (featuring Miami, Rott Wilder, Sugawolf, Dope Dogg & Reese) (3:48)
"Let's All Get Down" (3:48)

Notes 

1998 albums
Mac Dre albums
Gangsta rap albums by American artists
West Coast hip hop
Gangsta rap